The Year of Freaking Out is a 1997 Australian young adult novel by Sarah Walker about 17-year-old Kim, her relationship with her childhood friend Matthew and her passionate friendship with the new girl at school, Rachel.

1997 novels
Australian young adult novels
Lesbian culture in Australia
Novels with lesbian themes
Lesbian teen fiction
Australian LGBT novels
LGBT-related young adult novels